The Lune was a 38-gun ship of the line of the French Royal Navy, the first ship of the line to be built at the new state dockyard at Île d'Indret near Nantes, designed by Deviot and constructed by the Dutch shipwright Jan Gron (usually called Jean de Werth in French). She and her sister Soleil were two-deckers, with a mixture of bronze guns on both gun decks. 

The Lune took part in the Battle of Orbitello on 14 June 1646, as the flagship of Vice-amiral Louis Foucault de Saint-Germain-Beaupré, Comte de Daugnon, in the Battle of Castellammare on 21/22 December 1647, and in the Battle of Pertuis d'Antioche on 8 August 1652. She sailed on 9 November 1664 from Toulon for the Hyères Islands while carrying troops of the 1st Regiment of Picardy, but a half-hour after sailing she suddenly broke apart at the head and sank "like a marble", with only 60 survivors from over 600 aboard.

Sources and references 

Nomenclature des Vaisseaux de Louis XIII et de la régence d'Anne d'Autriche, 1610 a 1661. Alain Demerliac (Editions Omega, Nice – 2004).
The Sun King's Vessels (2015) - Jean-Claude Lemineur; English translation by François Fougerat. Editions ANCRE.  
Winfield, Rif and Roberts, Stephen (2017) French Warships in the Age of Sail 1626-1786: Design, Construction, Careers and Fates. Seaforth Publishing. . 

 Vaisseaux de Ligne Français de 1682 à 1780 1

Ships of the line of the French Navy
1640s ships